This is a list of episodes of the Australian children's television series Johnson and Friends.

Series overview

Episodes

Series 1 (1990)

Series 2 (1991)

Series 3 (1994)

Series 4 (1995–97)
All episodes were originally produced and aired for Fox and WQED Pittisburgh in United States, but it didn't air in Australia until 1997.

References

External links
 

Lists of Australian animated television series episodes
Lists of Australian children's television series episodes